Ghost Rider: Spirit of Vengeance is a 2011 American superhero film based on the Marvel Comics antihero Ghost Rider. It is a sequel to the 2007 film Ghost Rider and features Nicolas Cage reprising his role as Johnny Blaze / Ghost Rider with supporting roles portrayed by Ciarán Hinds, Violante Placido, Johnny Whitworth, Christopher Lambert, and Idris Elba. The film was directed by Mark Neveldine and Brian Taylor, from a screenplay written by Scott M. Gimple, Seth Hoffman, and David S. Goyer. Released publicly for one night on December 11, 2011, Ghost Rider: Spirit of Vengeance had its wide commercial release on February 17, 2012, in 2D and 3D.

The film experienced worse critical reception than the first film, with criticism being aimed towards the script, CGI, and acting. The film grossed more than $132 million, against its $57–75 million production budget.

Nicolas Cage stated that he was "done" with the Ghost Rider films and a planned sequel was cancelled. The film rights to the character were reverted to Marvel Studios shortly thereafter, and the Robbie Reyes version of Ghost Rider appeared in Agents of S.H.I.E.L.D.

Plot 
In rural Romania, an alcoholic monk named Moreau warns a nearby monastery about an impending ambush by Roarke's forces. They seek to kidnap a young boy named Danny and perform a ceremony on him that will allow the aging Roarke to transfer himself into Danny's body. A firefight ensues, and Danny is able to escape with his mother Nadya. Moreau decides to seek out Johnny Blaze, who is currently in hiding to prevent the Rider from running amok. Moreau offers to restore Johnny's soul and remove the Ghost Rider's curse in exchange for the Rider's help finding Danny.

Nadya and Danny are captured by Nadya's former boyfriend, Ray Carrigan. He is about to execute Nadya when the Ghost Rider appears, killing several of Carrigan's men. Nadya distracts the Ghost Rider, who is shot with grenades. Nadya escapes but Danny is recaptured. Carrigan informs Roarke about the Rider's interference and Roarke places a spell on Danny to stop the Rider from tracking him. Meanwhile, Blaze awakens in a hospital and leaves, following Nadya and convincing her to accept his help. Nadya explains that she made a deal with Roarke as well, and that Danny is Roarke's son.

That night, Nadya and Johnny interrogate a contact of Carrigan's and Johnny takes off to find Carrigan. The Rider emerges and takes on Carrigan's men, using an empowered mining machine to destroy their hideout and mortally wound Carrigan. The Rider turns on Nadya and attempts to use the Penance Stare on her but Danny is able to stop him. Roarke finds Carrigan nearly dead and revives him, granting him the ability to decay anything he touches. Johnny and Nadya bring Danny to the monastery, where Moreau explains that the Ghost Rider is an angel named Zarathos who was tortured and driven insane in Hell. Moreau tells Johnny that he can exorcise the spirit if Johnny tells a secret only he knows. Johnny confesses that his deal with Roarke was selfish: His father had accepted his cancer and was ready to die, but Johnny could not accept it. Moreau exorcises the spirit, and Johnny becomes human again. The head monk Methodius tries to kill Danny but Carrigan intervenes, killing the monks and recapturing Danny.

The ritual to transfer Roarke into Danny's body begins while Johnny, Nadya, and Moreau secretly infiltrate the ceremony. Carrigan kills Moreau while Danny returns the Ghost Rider to Johnny. Danny grants the Rider the ability to stay in Rider form even in broad daylight, the Rider then pursues Roarke. The Rider kills Carrigan and flips the car that Roarke and Danny are in before using his chain to hurl Roarke back to Hell. With Roarke defeated, Zarathos regains his sanity and is restored to his previous incarnation as the Spirit of Justice. Channeling the blue flame of Zarathos, Johnny revives Danny. As the film ends, Johnny is seen riding down the road in Rider form, but the flames on his bike and body are now blue.

Cast 
 Nicolas Cage as Johnny Blaze / Ghost Rider: A motorcycle stunt man who sold his soul to the devil to save his father from cancer, and became the devil's servant called the Spirit of Vengeance, a fiery spirit that feeds on the evil of its victims.
 Ionut Cristian Lefter as Young Johnny Blaze. Matt Long, who portrayed the character in the first film was originally set to reprise the role, but was eventually replaced by Lefter.
 Johnny Whitworth as Ray Carrigan / Blackout: A mercenary, drug dealer, and gun runner turned into Blackout by the devil to complete his job. This transformation gives him the fortitude and supernatural abilities to compete with Ghost Rider. Carrigan's powers are completely unlike those of the comic book character; writers admitted that the only aspect of Blackout they used in designing the movie version was his appearance.
 Fergus Riordan as Danny Ketch: A young child caught up in a demonic conspiracy who ends up in the care of Johnny Blaze during his travels.
 Ciarán Hinds as Mephistopheles "Mephisto" / Roarke: The demon who transformed Johnny Blaze into the Ghost Rider. Mephisto has fathered a child named Danny, and has plans for the boy. Peter Fonda, who portrayed the character in the first film, had previously expressed interest in reprising the role.
 Violante Placido as Nadya Ketch: Danny's mother and Ray's ex-girlfriend who helps Johnny to stop Mephisto from taking over Danny's body.
 Idris Elba as Moreau: A French member of a secret religious organization who joins forces with Johnny. He is the one who tells Johnny to find Danny. Moreau is an original character, not based on an existing comic character.
 Christopher Lambert as Methodius, a monk.
 Anthony Head as Benedict: A senior monk at the castle where Nadya and Danny are hiding at the start of the film.
 Jacek Koman as Terrokov
 Vincent Regan as Toma Nikasevic: An arms dealer who works with Carrigan.
 Spencer Wilding as Grannik

Production

Development

Marvel producer Avi Arad announced the development of Ghost Rider 2 at a press event in February 2007. Peter Fonda had also expressed a desire to return as Mephistopheles. In early December, Nicolas Cage also expressed interest to return in the lead role as Ghost Rider. Shortly after, in another interview he went on further to mention that he would enjoy seeing a darker story and suggested that the film could do with newly created villains. It was also rumored that the sequel would feature Danny Ketch, another Marvel character who took up the Ghost Rider mantle in the comics.
In a September 2008 interview, Cage informed IGN that Columbia had taken meetings to start a sequel. Cage noted conversations about the story, where Ghost Rider may end up in Europe on behalf of the church, having story elements "very much in the zeitgeist, like Da Vinci Code". In February 2009, an online source stated Columbia Pictures had greenlit a sequel to Ghost Rider. Nicolas Cage was stated to reprise the lead role, while the studio were in search of writers. David S. Goyer signed on to write the script for the sequel. Goyer spoke to MTV about the sequel, stating that the story would pick up eight years after the events of the first film and that he hopes to start filming by 2010.
The budget for "Spirit of Vengeance" was considerably lower than the first film, it cost an estimated $57–75 million to make, compared to the original film's $110 million price tag.

Casting
Nicolas Cage returned to his role, and Mark Neveldine and Brian Taylor were confirmed to direct the film, with editor Brian Berdan and cinematographer Brandon Trost reuniting with the directors from the Crank films. for his role, Cage painted his face black and white and wore black contact lenses on his eyes and sewed bits of Ancient Egyptian artifacts to his leather jacket to channel the spirit of vengeance. Taylor said this version of Ghost Rider was darker than the first film, and will be based on the miniseries Ghost Rider: Road to Damnation by Garth Ennis and Clayton Crain. Christopher Lambert underwent three months of sword training and shaved his head for his role. Johnny Whitworth was cast as the villain Blackout.

Filming 
Cage revealed shooting was to start in November. Eva Mendes did not return as Roxanne for the sequel. The film was shot in Romania and Turkey. The film started principal photography in Sibiu, Romania in November 2010, using mostly local talent. Principal photography was completed on January 24, 2011. The film was shot in 2D and converted in post-production to 3D.

Three scenes were shot on set Castel Film Romania. Among the places in the country chosen were Transfăgărăşan, Targu-Jiu, Hunedoara Castle and Bucharest.

Filming in Turkey took place in Cappadocia, a historical region in central Turkey with exotic chimney-topped rocky setting. The scene with the Greco-Roman theatre was filmed in Pamukkale where the ancient Greek (of the Seleucid Empire) city of Hierapolis once stood. The motorcycle used by Cage was a Yamaha VMAX.

Marketing

The producers employed a mix of targeted traditional advertising and television appearances, as well aggressive social media marketing. Sony teamed up with West Coast Marketing and launched the face of the fan competition, where artists were challenged to design an alternate poster for the film. The contest was won by New York digital media artist Justin Paul. The directing team of Mark Neveldine and Brian Taylor, known for the Crank films were already popular with the young male demographic, and further fueled early interest in the film with a presentation at the 2010 San Diego Comic-con. The executive pointed out that the marketing campaign has used star Nicolas Cage sparingly in U.S. TV commercials. Cage appeared on Saturday Night Live and heavily promoted the film in Europe but he plays a secondary role to the film's effects and imagery, which one executive said made the marketing campaign seem more like it was for a video game.

Reception

Box office 
The film opened in 3,174 theaters at #3, with North American box office receipts of $22.1 million, behind Safe House, which moved to #1 on its second weekend. The Vow, the holdover from the previous week, made less than half of Ghost Rider's opening weekend of $45.4 million. It went on to gross $51.8 million at the U.S. box office and $80.8 million internationally, for a worldwide total of $132.6 million.

Critical response 

The website's consensus reads: "With a weak script, uneven CG work, and a Nic Cage performance so predictably loony it's no longer amusing, Ghost Rider: Spirit of Vengeance aims to be trashy fun but ends up as plain trash". On Metacritic, the film has a weighted average score of 34 out of 100, based on 22 critics, indicating "generally unfavorable reviews". Audiences polled by Cinemascore gave the film a "C+" rating on a scale from A to F, lower than the first film "B".

Reviewers who viewed an early preview screening at the December 2011 Butt-Numb-A-Thon in Austin expressed negative reactions to the film. Two attendees said it was worse than the first Ghost Rider film, and one said that the sequel makes the first film "look like The Dark Knight" by comparison.

IGN reviewer Scott Collura gave the movie four out of five stars, saying it "is a movie you'll either love or hate". He commends the film for bringing the cartoonish insanity of the Crank movies to the insane concept of Ghost Rider. Andrew Barker of Variety called it a marginal improvement on the first film but said "the picture is still much too rickety, slapdash and surprisingly dull to qualify as a good barrel-bottom pleasure." Ben Sachs of the Chicago Reader notes that this is the first time directors Neveldine and Taylor have directed a script they didn't write, "and the superhero plot often seems to hamper their imaginations" but says the film "doesn't lack for crazy charm", praising Cage and Hinds for their admittedly weird performances.

Marc Savlov from The Austin Chronicle awarded the film 1.5 out of 5 stars, writing: "Cage appears to find his role as this second-tier Marvel Comics antihero alternately silly, tremendously fun, and the means to a decent paycheck for not all that much work." Savlov also criticized the film's use of 3D as being "a few shots of flaming motorcycle parts comin' at ya, but little else." Nathan Rabin of The A.V. Club welcomed Idris Elba's role as the alcoholic priest Moreau, but criticized the film for "squandering even more potential" and that it fails to achieve the "go-for-broke energy of superior trash." Peter Travers of Rolling Stone called the film "a dreadful mess", and "a dishwater dull sequel to the hellishly bad 2007 original", and said he'd never seen worse 3D.

Accolades 

Ghost Rider: Spirit of Vengeance was nominated for two Golden Raspberry Awards: Worst Actor (Nicolas Cage; also for Seeking Justice) and Worst Remake, Rip-off or Sequel.

Future 
  
Shortly after the film's release, directors Mark Neveldine and Brian Taylor discussed producing a potential Ghost Rider 3, and having someone else direct it. Neveldine said that Cage had expressed interest in appearing in another Ghost Rider film, hinting that the film could move forward provided that Spirit of Vengeance was a success: "I know Nic wants to do it, he's very pumped about it ... We'll just have to see how well [this] does." When Cage was asked about a possible third installment, he said that it could happen, but without his involvement, later officially clarifying that he was done with his role and expressed interest to see female Ghost Rider in the film.

The film rights to Ghost Rider reverted to Marvel Studios in 2013, but there were no immediate plans to make another Ghost Rider film. In 2016, the Robbie Reyes incarnation of the character appeared in the Marvel Cinematic Universe through the television series Agents of S.H.I.E.L.D., where he is portrayed by Gabriel Luna. A television series based on Robbie Reyes's incarnation of Ghost Rider was announced to premiere on Hulu in 2020, but the series did not go forward.

References

External links 
 
 
 

2011 films
2011 3D films
2011 action films
2011 fantasy films
2010s superhero films
2010s monster movies
American 3D films
American fantasy action films
American sequel films
American superhero films
American supernatural thriller films
Columbia Pictures films
Crystal Sky Pictures films
Demons in film
2010s English-language films
Entertainment One films
Ghost Rider (film series)
Films about stunt performers
Films directed by Neveldine/Taylor
Films produced by Michael De Luca
Films scored by David Sardy
Films set in Europe
Films shot in Romania
Films shot in Turkey
Hyde Park Entertainment films
Superhero horror films
The Devil in film
Films about Romani people
Films with screenplays by David S. Goyer
2010s American films